The 1975–76 Cypriot Second Division was the 21st season of the Cypriot second-level football league. Chalkanoras Idaliou won their 1st title.

Format
Thirdteen teams participated in the 1975–76 Cypriot Second Division. All teams played against each other twice, once at their home and once away. The team with the most points at the end of the season crowned champions. The first team was promoted to 1976–77 Cypriot First Division.

League standings

See also
 Cypriot Second Division
 1975–76 Cypriot First Division
 1975–76 Cypriot Cup

References

Cypriot Second Division seasons
Cyprus
1975–76 in Cypriot football